Starosharipovo (İśke Şärip) is a rural locality (a village) in Sokolovsky Selsoviet, Davlekanovsky District, Bashkortostan, Russia. The population was 126 as of 2010. There are 3 streets.

Geography 
Starosharipovo is located 12 km east of Davlekanovo (the district's administrative centre) by road. Novosharipovo is the nearest rural locality.

References 

Rural localities in Davlekanovsky District